The Power of Salad, also known as The Power of Salad & Milkshakes, is a film by Peter Glantz and Nick Noe, featuring and documenting the Providence, Rhode Island noise rock band Lightning Bolt.  The film follows the avant-garde duo, Brian Gibson and Brian Chippendale, through a tour of the states, along with interviews of the band and their friends and family.

Live performances, for which Lightning Bolt is renowned, were shot from June 2–21 and July 14–15, 2001.  These performances were held in, in the order they were listed: 
Washington, D.C. 
Houston, Texas 
Davis, California
Philadelphia, Pennsylvania 
Lubbock, Texas
Providence, Rhode Island 
New Orleans, Louisiana 
Brooklyn, New York 
Oakland, California
San Diego, California
Chapel Hill, North Carolina
Shreveport, Louisiana
Charlotte, North Carolina
Austin, Texas
Phoenix, Arizona
Los Angeles, California
San Francisco, California
Mobile, Alabama 
Fort Sumner, New Mexico 
Fort Thunder, Rhode Island

Appearances, interviews, and cameos are made by Pink and Brown, Dave Auchenbach, and Load Records founder Ben McOsker.

A music video to "13 Monsters" by Paper Rad is also included on the DVD.

External links
 
 Load Records' The Power of Salad page

Documentary films about rock music and musicians
American documentary films
2002 films
2000s English-language films
2000s American films